Georgi Danov (born 17 October 1990) is a Bulgarian footballer who plays as a midfielder. His first club was Maritsa Plovdiv. Danov signed a 5-year deal with Loko Plovdiv in June 2008.

External links
  Profile at lokomotivpd.com

Living people
1990 births
Bulgarian footballers
First Professional Football League (Bulgaria) players
Association football midfielders
PFC Lokomotiv Plovdiv players